Barcarrota is a Spanish municipality in the province of Badajoz, Extremadura. It has a population of 3,664 (2007) and an area of 136.1 km².

Barcarrota was the location of the Battle of Villanueva de Barcarrota (1336), in which Castilian troops decisively defeated a Portuguese army.

References

Municipalities in the Province of Badajoz